Gholam-Reza Nikpey (غلامرضا نیک‌پی), also Nikpay (1927 – 11 April 1979) was deputy prime minister of Iran and Mayor of Tehran. He became Mayor of Tehran in 1969, succeeding Javad Shahrestani. Prior to that, he had served as Iran's Minister of Housing from 1966 to 1969. During his tenure as the Housing Minister, an earthquake rocked the Province of Khorasan, causing mass destruction. He was in charge of rebuilding. It turned out to be one of the best rebuilding projects in the country's history. In 1977, he was appointed to the Iranian Senate by the Shah.

He was executed on 11 April 1979 on the orders of a revolutionary tribunal, apparently without legal representation or a chance to defend himself. Nikpay is one of the victims listed in the 13 March 1980 Amnesty International report. International human rights organizations have drawn attention to reports indicating that the Islamic Republic's authorities executed individuals on trumped-up charges.

Early life
Nikpey was born in 1927 in Isfahan to Azizullah Nikpey. His father, also called Ezazolmalek, studied in the US and was governor of the province of Kermanshah during Reza Shah reign. Azizullah later became Minister of Post and Telegraph. Nikpey's maternal grandfather Zalolsoltan was from Qajar royal family and was the son of Naser al-Din Shah Qajar and at one point was set to succeed his father as king, however Mozaffar ad-Din Shah Qajar became king instead of him. Gholamreza spent his childhood in Isfahan and Kermanshah and entered Tehran University to study law. He went to England to continue his studies and obtained his PhD in 1335 A.H. from the London School of Economics, and then returned to Iran.

After his return, he was employed by the Iranian National Oil Company. He went on to become VP to Prime Minister Hassan Ali Mansur. He was later the director of Kaakh Javanan. He became the mayor of Tehran in 1346 AH. After his tenure as mayor, he went on to become the representative of Isfahan in the Iranian senate. He was later arrested during political arrests later that year. During the Iranian revolution Nikpey was in jail in Tehran and was freed by the revolutionaries.

Arrest and execution
Nikpey was arrested shortly after the revolution. He was charged with dubious charges such as collaborating with imperialists, collaborating with the Pahlavi regime, not doing enough work as mayor and not fixing traffic problems, taking bribes, changing the comprehensive plan for the city of Tehran, and other non-specific charges and was quickly sentenced to death. He was executed on 11April 1979.

Activities as mayor 
Nikpey made many improvements during his reign as mayor. Some of his actions include the construction of highways and parks, a comprehensive plan of Tehran, an urban tax, tax for non-rental buses and cars, building parking facilities, limiting the privacy of the capital zone, recycling waste into fertilizer, establishment of a soil mechanics laboratory, creating a development organization and renovation of Abbas Abad, changing the title of sweeper to civil service worker, establishing the development of public revenues, establishment of the Directorate General of Budget, improvement in buses, allocation of funds to build a building for children with disabilities, modification of the capital's mayoral department, allocation of funds for the construction of West Tehran flood, reconstruction of shops in the city that existed before the adoption of the comprehensive plan, building of Niavaran Park, creating an inspection agency, establishing DMV, redeveloping the slaughterhouse and morgue of Tehran, review of Urban Planning Department and urban areas, street parking in the southern area of Persepolis St. (Taleghani),development of public housing and apartment building for municipal staff, park construction and building artificial lake in the south near Azadi Tower, plans to establish public housing, establishing three-bed nursing homes for the elderly in Kahrizak.

Seoul visit

Gholamreza Nikpey travelled to Seoul on 27 June 1977. Seoul Metropolitan Government suggested that the city of Seoul and Tehran for exchanging the names of streets on the occasion of the visit to Korea of Gholamreza Nikpay, Mayor of Tehran. The following year, Samneungno street was renamed Teheran, which then ran through a relatively underdeveloped area recently annexed to Seoul. Today, Teheran-ro is one of Seoul's busiest streets, the location of major finance, tech, and cultural institutions. Likewise, there is a Seoul Street in Tehran.

References

External links

Boroumand Foundation file on Mr. Nikpay

Mayors of Tehran
1979 deaths
People executed by Iran by firing squad
Iranian Vice Ministers
Government ministers of Iran
1927 births
Iran Novin Party politicians
Rastakhiz Party politicians
Politicians executed during the Iranian Revolution
20th-century Iranian people